Garrison Cadet College Kohat is a boarding school, situated in the suburb of Kohat City. The college has classes from class 8th to FSc (Pre-Engineering and Pre-Medical Level). Students are inducted in class 8 and Class 11; after a 3-step selection process, which composed of a written test, interview and medical examination. The college has over 600 enrolled cadets aged 13–19 years. Each class has approximately 120 cadets.

History
Garrison Cadet College Kohat is situated in the suburb of Kohat City. The foundation stone of the college was laid on 1 March 1990 by the then Prime Minister of Pakistan Mohtarma Benazir Bhutto. The college was inaugurated on 10 May 1993 by the then Quartermaster General of Pakistan Army, Lieutenant General Muhammad Arif Bangash. It was established as Kohat Garrison College but later it was renamed Garrison Cadet College Kohat in 1999. Regular classes commenced in March 1993. The first principal was Col Muhammad Idrees Niazi (Late). The college is affiliated and patronized by the Provincial Government of KP since 2017.

About
Garrison Cadet College Kohat is spread over an area of about 85 acres. The college has an academic block for 600 cadets, six hostels, laboratories for Computer, Chemistry, Physics, Biology and Language, a library, an administration block and a tuck shop. A bakery, barber shop, cobbler, tailor, and laundry services are available for the cadets. The college has a mosque where 1000 people can pray at a time. The college has a dispensary stocked with medicines and equipment. A doctor and 0 non-commissioned army officers retired from Army Medical Corps look after the health of cadets. The college has several playgrounds. These playgrounds are used for games during the sports period. Regular Inter-House sports competitions are held.

Facilities
The college has classes from class 8th to FSc (Pre-Engineering and Pre-Medical Level). The medium of instruction is English for all classes. The cadets are prepared for Secondary School Certificate (Matriculation) and Higher Secondary School Certificate examinations. The college is affiliated with the Federal Board of Intermediate & Secondary Education, Islamabad. Terminal examinations are held at the end of all terms (1st term- June, 2nd term- November). Annual internal promotion examinations are held in March. Besides this, monthly and end chapter tests are held throughout the academic year to check assimilation and progress of the cadets. Progress reports are sent to the parents after each examination (less monthly and spot tests). Promotion from school to the college classes is not automatic. Admission to class 11 (FSc Part-I) depends upon the students’ over-all academic performance, result of matriculation examination and their disciplinary record.

Cadets failing in the annual promotion examination are made to repeat the same class. If they do not show improvement in academic performance and fail for the second time, they are withdrawn from the college.

Religion and Ideology

Islamiyat is a compulsory subject for Muslim cadets. The essentials of Islam are taught in the classroom. Religious education in the classroom is supplemented by five time prayers in the college mosque, for which provision is made in the college daily routine. The morning assembly begins with recitation from the Quran, followed by translation in English and Urdu. In spare time, the College Khateeb teaches Nazira of the Quran to those cadets who cannot recite the Quran. Inter-House Qirat and Naat Khawani Competitions are held to provide incentive to the cadets to learn and enhance their skills in Qirat and Naat Khawani. Talks and sermons are arranged on Islamic values and ideology of Pakistan.

Bio Lab:
Bio Laboratory is a facility that provides controlled conditions in which scientific research, experiments, and measurement may be performed. Biology lab is a staple of most high school/colleges curriculum. Students learn not only about nature and evolution, but also about the scientific process and proper procedure for conducting experiments. Biology Lab of GCCK is equipped to conduct the practical exams of HSSC and SSC. There are five members of teaching staff and one lab assistant to look after the needs of SSC and HSSC students.

Chemistry Lab:
There are five members of teaching staff and one lab assistant to look after the needs of SSC and HSSC students. The Lab contains all the necessary equipment such as Bench-Tables with sink, water and gas connections, Oven, Glove bag, Digital Balances, PH meter, Water Distillation Plant, Thermometer, Glass apparatus, Vacuum Filtering Flasks etc. All the required chemicals are available.

Physics Lab:
There are five members of teaching staff and one lab assistant to look after the needs of SSC and HSSC students. The Lab contains all the  equipment to cater for the needs of SSC and HSSC level practicals / research work.

Computer Lab:
Computer training is compulsory for all cadets. Progressive computer training is imparted to all the cadets from class 8 to 12, under the supervision of a well-qualified computer officer. A computer laboratory is available to the cadets. In addition, a computer club with internet facility is available to the club members.

Language Lab:
A Language Laboratory is present in the college which helps the cadets in polishing their English language skills.

Library:
The college has a Library, managed by a Librarian who holds master's degree in Library Sciences. Educational audio and visual aids are used to make classroom instruction more effective and palatable. In addition the library possesses an E-Library of 27,000 books.  The library is also equipped with a television and VCR/DVD used for showing informative, historical, educational, geographical and cultural movies to the cadets. The college subscribes to leading English and Urdu magazines and Newspapers. These newspapers are available to the cadets both in library as well as in hostels. Every class has specific number of Library periods per week. Nominated classes visit the Library in the prescribed periods and read books, magazines and newspapers of their choice. In addition they are also trained on methods of searching the desired publications/information. The cadets have the facility to draw books of their choice to read during leisure time in the hostels.

College Magazine:
A quality College Magazine “Garrisonian” is published annually. It is compiled and published under an editorial board comprising teachers and cadets. Most of the articles for the magazine are contributed by the cadets.

Boarding

House System
There are six houses in Garrison Cadet College Kohat. The houses are named after personalities of Muslim history namely, Ayubi House, Sina House, Ghazali House,  Zangi House, Jinnah House and Kayani House named after the renowned Jurist, Muhammad Rustam Kayani. Each cadet is allotted a house at the time of admission in the college. Each house is supervised by a house warden, who is assisted by a house tutor, cadet appointments, one non-commissioned officer (drill and PT instructor) and two house Babas.

Cadets Mess
The college has messes for each house. Messes are managed by a Messing Officer, who is assisted by a Mess Supervisor and three Assistant Mess Supervisors. Messes are supported by a Roti Plant for baking of bread.

Mosque
The college mosque is the center of all religious activities. It has the capacity to accommodate about 1500 people at a time. Besides the daily 5 times prayers, Jumma Prayers, Travih Prayers, in Ramadan, are offered. Moreover, other religious functions like Eid-Milad-un-Nabi, Shab-e-Barat, 27 Ramadan- etc. are also performed here. A regular Khateeb and Moazzan (both Hafiz-e-Quran) have been appointed  for said purposes

Sports and Leisure

Sports & Physical Training
Sports and physical training are compulsory for all cadets. Morning PT and drill of all houses are conducted and supervised by the adjutant and respective in-charge non-commissioned officers. Regular inter house competitions in sports, PT, and Drill are held in order to inculcate a competitive spirit among the cadets. The college also plays friendly matches with teams of other colleges and clubs. A swimming pool is available. A gymnasium and two squash courts are also available. 

Play fields
 Basketball Courts 3
 Football Grounds 3
 Hockey Grounds 2
 Cricket Ground 2
 Volleyball Courts 3
 Badminton Courts 2
 Table Tennis 6
 Assault Course 1
 Athletics Track 1
 Swimming Pool 1
 Squash Courts 2
 Gym 1
 Lawn Tennis Court 2

Clubs
The college offers the students extracurricular activities. Some major clubs are:
Science Club
Hiking and Trekking Club
Photography/Painting Club
Horticulture Club
Scouting Club
Dramatic Club
English/Urdu Literary Club
Taekwondo Club
Shooting Club
Horse Riding Club
Para Gliding Facility in Kohat Cantt
Archery Club

Tours and excursions
The college organizes educational trips and tours to prominent places. A visit to the Pakistan Military Academy Kakul twice a year is a regular feature.

Internet & Cable TV

Internet
The college has a 40MBPs wired connection which looks after the needs of computer lab, library and faculty members for study and research work.

Cable TV Network
The college has own cable network with news, sports and controlled entertainment channels. A movie is run on a weekly basis.

Medical

Medical Facilities (MI ROOM)

The college has an MI Room. Two  nursing assistants are present in the college round the clock and look after the health problems and minor ailments of the cadets. Routine medical care and immediate first aid is provided to the cadets. A qualified MBBS doctor visits college every evening and checks the sick cadets. Cases requiring specialized treatment are referred to CMH Kohat or Civil Hospital Kohat. Specialist's fee and hospital expenditures (in case of admission) are included in the bills of the cadets. Cadets suffering from serious diseases are either admitted in CMH Kohat or sent to their homes for the treatment through their parents.

Cafeteria and guest rooms

Tuck Shop & PCO
A tuck shop and fruit shop are available to the cadets. Since keeping of mobile phones is prohibited for the cadets, the college administration has arranged a public call office. The cadets can call their parents using PCO.  In  addition, parents can directly call the cadets on house landline numbers on specified days.

Stationery and item store
All syllabus books, stationery and stores, etc. are procured by the college and provided to the cadets cheaper than the market rates.

Guest rooms block
A guest rooms block comprising 16 fully furnished guest rooms is available to accommodate the parents visiting their wards over weekends.

Security and electricity generator backup

Security and safety
The college is guarded through a security system.

Electricity generator backup
Two generators meet the needs in a power crisis.

ServicesS

Barber and washerman
Three barbers are hired by the college who take care of haircuts. There is a laundry available to the cadets where washermen wash their clothes, uniforms etc. and also render ironing services.

Cobbler and tailor
The service of a cobbler  are available to the cadets in the Campus. There is a tailor who prepares uniforms and suits for the cadets.

Houses

Present composition of BOG
Patron-in-Chief
Chief Minister of Khyber Pakhtunkhwa Province
Chairman
General Officer Commanding 9th Infantry Division, Kohat
Members
Secretary E&SE KP
Secretary Finance KP
Secretary Establishment KP
Secretary P&D KP
Commissioner Kohat Division 
Commandant Signal Training Centre, Kohat
VC KUST
RPO Kohat Division
Station Commander, Kohat
Principal (Member / Secretary)

See also
Kohat
Cadet College Hasan Abdal
Cadet College Kohat
PAF Public School Sargodha
Military College Jhelum

References

Cadet colleges in Pakistan
Schools in Pakistan
Boarding schools in Pakistan